José-Luis Velador (born in Jalisco, Mexico) is a Mexican-American professional poker player from Corona, California, who is a two-time World Series of Poker bracelet winner. He won his first bracelet at the 2008 World Series of Poker beating Chris Signore in the $1,500 No-Limit Hold'em event and then two years later at the 2010 World Series of Poker he won his second bracelet after defeating David Chiu heads-up in the $2,500 Pot Limit Hold'em/Omaha event.

As of 2018, his total live tournament winnings exceed $2,150,000.

World Series of Poker bracelets

Notes

Living people
World Series of Poker bracelet winners
American poker players
Mexican poker players
Year of birth missing (living people)